Bird Island is a tiny island in Buzzards Bay at the mouth of Sippican Harbor, less than a mile off the mainland coast of the town of Marion, Massachusetts, United States.

Landmarks
The only landmarks on Bird Island are a flagpole and a historic  lighthouse. Bird Island Light was formerly staffed but now runs automatically. The Great New England Hurricane caused widespread destruction all along the south coast of New England. The great storm swept away every building on Bird Island except the lighthouse tower.

Flora and fauna
Bird Island is notable as a sanctuary and major breeding ground of the roseate tern, a bird from which the island gained its name.

See also
Islands of Massachusetts

Sources
 Every Day Life in the Massachusetts Bay Colony by George Francis Dow
The Standard Times newspaper of New Bedford Massachusetts.
Rhode Island, Massachusetts & New Hampshire Maptech Embassy Guide,

External links

Coastal islands of Massachusetts
Islands of Plymouth County, Massachusetts
Marion, Massachusetts